Dominique Bailly (born 2 January 1960) is a member of the Senate of France.  He was first elected in 2011, and represents the Nord  department.  A Finance Department Official by profession, he serves as a member of the Socialist. He has been the mayor of Orchies since 2005.

References

*Page on the French Senate website

1960 births
Living people
French Senators of the Fifth Republic
Senators of Nord (French department)
Socialist Party (France) politicians